Architrypethelium penuriixanthum is a species of corticolous (bark-dwelling) lichen in the family Trypetheliaceae. Found in Bolivia, it was formally described as a new species in 2016 by lichenologists Adam Flakus and André Aptroot. The type specimen was collected near Sehuencas village, Carrasco Province (Dept. Cochabamba); there, at an elevation of  it was found in a mountainous Yungas cloud forest. It is similar to Architrypethelium hyalinum, but unlike that species, does not have lichexanthone in its thallus. The species epithet penuriixanthum alludes to the absence of xanthones.

References

Trypetheliaceae
Lichen species
Lichens described in 2016
Lichens of Bolivia
Taxa named by André Aptroot
Taxa named by Adam Grzegorz Flakus